Red Hot Mamma is a 1934 Fleischer Studios Betty Boop animated short, directed by Dave Fleischer.

Plot summary
It's a snowy winter's night, and a shivering Betty is trying to sleep. Shutting all the windows isn't enough, so she lights a roaring fire in the fireplace and falls asleep on the hearthplace rug. The heat of the flames soon turns two roosting chickens into roasted chickens, and causes Betty to dream that her fireplace has become the gate to Hell itself. Betty explores the underworld, and sings "Hell's Bells" for Satan and his minions. When Satan tries to put the moves on Betty, she fixes him with a (literally) icy stare, freezing him and all of Hell. When she falls through a hole and onto an icy surface below, Betty wakes up to find the fire out with the windows open and her bed frozen, and she goes to bed, this time under a pile of warm quilts.

Notes
Clips of the redrawn colorized version were used in the compilation movie Betty Boop For President: The Movie (1980).

Censorship
In 1934 the film was rejected by the BBFC in the United Kingdom, because it depicted Hell in a humorous manner, which was deemed blasphemous.

Sources

External links
 Watch Red Hot Mamma (uncensored) in fully restored HD at Laugh Bureau Vintage
 Red Hot Mamma on YouTube
 Red Hot Mamma at the Big Cartoon Database
 

Films originally rejected by the British Board of Film Classification
1934 films
Betty Boop cartoons
1930s American animated films
American black-and-white films
Films set in hell
Paramount Pictures short films
1934 animated films
Fleischer Studios short films
Short films directed by Dave Fleischer
Film controversies
Film controversies in the United Kingdom
Religious controversies in the United Kingdom
Religious controversies in animation
Religious controversies in film
The Devil in film